Abraham Houghtaling House is a historic home located at Coeymans Landing in Albany County, New York.  It was built about 1830 and is a two-story, rectangular, heavy timber frame Greek Revival style dwelling. It features a projecting center entry bay and a single story porch. It has a rubble stone foundation and a broad, overhanging gable roof.  Also on the property is a contributing smoke house.

It was listed on the National Register of Historic Places in 1998.

References

Houses on the National Register of Historic Places in New York (state)
Greek Revival houses in New York (state)
Houses completed in 1830
Houses in Albany County, New York
1830 establishments in New York (state)
National Register of Historic Places in Albany County, New York